Odile Versois (born Étiennette de Poliakoff-Baydaroff; 15 June 1930 – 23 June 1980) was a French actress who appeared in 47 film and television productions between 1948 and 1980. Versois was the sister of actresses Marina Vlady, Hélène Vallier and Olga Baïdar-Poliakoff. Their father, Vladimir, was a noted opera singer of Russian descent, and their mother, Militza Envald Voropanoff, was a dancer. Born in Paris, she began acting as a child and for a while pursued a ballet career.

Personal life
Versois married actor Jacques René Dacqmine (30 November 1923 – 29 March 2010; The Queen's Necklace) in 1951 but the couple divorced a year later. She had four children by her second husband, Comte François Reynier Ambroise Henri Pozzo di Borgo, whom she married in 1953 but also divorced. She died in 1980 in Paris of cancer shortly after her 50th birthday.

Filmography

References

External links

Odile Versois profile, Cinememorial.com 
Odile Versois profile, Premiere.fr 

1930 births
1980 deaths
Deaths from cancer in France
Actresses from Paris
French people of Russian descent
Burials at Sainte-Geneviève-des-Bois Russian Cemetery
French film actresses
French television actresses
20th-century French actresses